Loups-Garoux (French for werewolves) is a Big Finish Productions audio drama based on the long-running British science fiction television series Doctor Who.

Plot
In Brazil in the year 2080, the Fifth Doctor and Turlough are confronted by an ancient werewolf.

Notes
This adventure takes place between the television stories Resurrection of the Daleks and Planet of Fire.
Eleanor Bron previously appeared in the television series as an art critic in City of Death and Kara in Revelation of the Daleks. Burt Kwouk previously appeared in the television series as Lin Futu in Four to Doomsday. Derek Wright played a Roundhead that assailed the UNIT convoy in The Time Monster.
The first scene quotes the real death sentence on Peter Stumpp from the documented report of his trial in Cologne in 1589.
The new spine design was based on the 1999 David Bowie album reissues.
Stubbe implies that he ate the Grand Duchess Anastasia, the only member of the Tsar's family whose body was not accounted for after the 1917 revolution (until DNA testing in 2009 confirmed her death). Ileana also suggests that Stubbe ate the notorious Lord Lucan, who went missing in 1974.
The dog whistle the Doctor uses is most likely the one the Fourth Doctor used to call K9 whenever he and Romana ran into trouble and needed K9’s help to rescue them.
The Doctor also encounters an Earthbound werewolf in Wolfsbane, and alien werewolves in The Greatest Show in the Galaxy, Kursaal and Tooth and Claw. The werewolf of Wolfsbane is also tied to the natural cycles of the earth and is vulnerable to silver; however, the wolves of Loups-Garoux do not appear to be tied to the phases of the moon.
When the Doctor gives a list of his female companions he misses out Leela, who is also missing in the images of them in Resurrection of the Daleks.

Cast
The Doctor — Peter Davison
Turlough — Mark Strickson
Magistrate — Nicholas Pegg
Pieter Stubbe — Nicky Henson
Rosa Caiman — Sarah Gale
Inez — Jane Burke
Ileana de Santos — Eleanor Bron
Greetings Card — Alistair Lock
Anton Lichtfuss — David Hankinson
Tourist — Marc Platt
Victor — Barnaby Edwards
Doctor Hayashi — Burt Kwouk
Jorge — Derek Wright

Working Titles
The Werelings
The Moon of Blood

External links
Big Finish Productions – Loups-Garoux

Fifth Doctor audio plays
2001 audio plays
Audio plays by Marc Platt
Fiction set in the 2080s
Werewolf fiction